Mark of the Beast is a 1923 American silent drama film directed by Thomas Dixon Jr. and starring Robert Ellis, Madelyn Clare and Warner Richmond.

Cast
 Robert Ellis as Dr. David Hale 
 Madelyn Clare as Ann Page 
 Warner Richmond as Donald Duncan 
 Gustav von Seyffertitz as John Hunter 
 Helen Ware as Jane Hunter 
 William McGinnity as The Baby

References

Bibliography
 Munden, Kenneth White. The American Film Institute Catalog of Motion Pictures Produced in the United States, Part 1. University of California Press, 1997.

External links
 

1923 films
1923 drama films
1920s English-language films
American silent feature films
Silent American drama films
Films directed by Thomas Dixon Jr.
American black-and-white films
Films distributed by W. W. Hodkinson Corporation
1920s American films